Stancho Georgiev Stanchev (Bulgarian Станчо Георгиев Станчев) is a Bulgarian theatre director.

Biography

Stancho Stanchev was born on 5 Septembre 1932 in Plovdiv, Bulgaria.  He graduated the DVTU (Public Higher School of Theater) presently "Krastyo Sarafov" National Academy for Theatre and Film Arts Sofia in 1955, speciality theatre directing under Prof. Boyan Danovski.
He completed a postgraduate degree at the Vakhtangov Theatre under Evgeny Simonov and at the Moscow Satire Theatre under Valentin Pluchek in Moscow.

Stancho Stanchev has staged more than 100 plays by Bulgarian and foreign playwrights on the stages of the drama theatres in Varna, Ruse, Shumen, Sofia, Moscow, Silistra, Pazardzhik.
His wife is the artist Daria Vassilyanska.He died on 23 Octobre 2017 in Varna.

Career
 1955–1959 - theatre director at  "Vasil Drumev" Drama Theatre - Shumen
 1959–1962 - theatre director at "Sava Ognianov" Drama Theatre - Ruse
 1962–1992 - theatre director, artistic director of  "Stoyan Bachvarov" Drama Theatre - Varna

Performances
 The Crucible, Arthur Miller, Drama Theatre, Shumen, 1955–56
 Le Baruffe Chiozzotte /The Chioggia Scuffles/, Carlo Goldoni, Drama Theatre, Shumen, 1956
 Notre-Dame de Paris, Victor Hugo, Drama Theatre, Shumen, 1958
 Buonanotte Patrizia, Aldo De Benedetti, Drama Theatre, Shumen, 1958
 The General and the Mad, Angel Vagenshtain, Drama Theatre, Ruse, 1961
 De Pretore Vincenzo, Eduardo De Filippo, Drama Theatre, Ruse, 1959
 Duel, Ivan Vazov, Drama Theatre Varna, 1962–63
 Around the World in Eighty Days, Pavel Kohout, Drama Theatre, Varna, 1965–66
 The Investigation /Die Ermittlung/, Peter Weiss, Drama Theatre, Varna, 1966–67
 As You Like It, William Shakespeare, Drama Theatre, Varna, 1972–73
 January Yordan Radichkov, Drama Theatre, Varna, 1974–75
 The Roman Bath Stanislav Stratiev, Drama Theatre, Varna, 1974–75
 The Good Soldier Švejk, Jaroslav Hašek, Drama Theatre, Varna, 1975–76
 The Suede Jacket, Stanislav Stratiev, Pushkin Theatre, Moscow, 1977
 The Effect of Gamma Rays on Man-in-the-Moon Marigolds, Paul Zindel, Drama Theatre, Varna, 1978–79
 The Suede Jacket, Stanislav Stratiev, Drama Theatre, Varna, 1978–79
 One Flew Over the Cuckoo's Nest, after Ken Kesey, stage adaptation Dale Wasserman, Drama Theatre, Varna, 1979–80
 Little Comedies, after Anton Chekhov /A Marriage Proposal, On the Harmful Effects of Tobacco, Jubilee, The Swan Song, Drama Theatre, Varna, 1979–80
 Archangels Don't Play Pinball, Dario Fo, Drama Theatre, Varna, 1980–81
 Cyrano de Bergerac, Edmond Rostand, Drama Theatre, Varna, 1981–82
 The Government Inspector, Nikolai Gogol, Drama Theatre, Varna, 1986–87
 All House, Bed and Church, Dario Fo, Drama Theatre, Varna, 1986–87
 The Holy Family, György Schwajda, 1988–89
 The Last Tape /Krapp's Last Tape/, Samuel Beckett, Drama Theatre, Varna, 1991–92
 The Basement, Murray Schisgal, State Puppet Theatre Varna, 1993
 Nora /A Doll's House /, Henrik Ibsen, Art Club Sezam, Varna, 1995
 Miracle, Ivan Radoev, Drama Theatre, Pazardzhik, 1995
 Who's Afraid of Virginia Woolf?, Edward Albee, Drama Theatre, Varna, 1996–97
 L’enseineur ou Une ombre au tableau, Jean-Pierre Dopagne, Drama Theatre, Varna, 2003

Notes

 The Prostori Magazine for Literature and Art, Septembre 2006
  Encyclopedia of the Bulgarian Theatre, 2005,p. 370, Publishing House Trud, Sofia
 Art Dialog

References

External links
 site of Stancho Stanchev
 Bulgarian portal
 state puppet theatre varna
 drama theatre varna - awards
 article of Lyubomir Kutin about the performance One Flew Over the Cuckoo's Nest
 essay of Siya Papazova
 archives of the Drama Theatre, Shumen
 From Küçük Paris to Plovdiv
 Obituary
 Interview with Stancho Stanchev

Sources

The Prostori Magazine for Literature and Art
Encyclopedia of the Bulgarian Theatre
official site of Drama Theatre Varna

Bulgarian theatre directors
1932 births
People from Plovdiv
Living people